Louis Michael "Lou" Martin (12 August 1949 – 17 August 2012) was a piano and organ player from Belfast, Northern Ireland. He was an original member of the London-based band Killing Floor, and also worked with fellow Irish musician Rory Gallagher.

Career
Martin started learning the piano at the age of six, and joined his first professional band, Killing Floor, in April or May 1968. In 1969 Martin and Stuart McDonald were recruited by 17-year-old Darryl Read who formed a band for Emperor Rosko's brother (Jeff Pasternak) called Crayon Angels, which Read put together and played drums, while Rosko acted as manager.  Martin later left Killing Floor to play alongside Gallagher, and is featured on several of Gallagher's albums, including Blueprint, Tattoo, Irish Tour '74, Against the Grain, Calling Card, Defender and Fresh Evidence. He also played rhythm guitar on one track, "Race the Breeze" from Blueprint.

After leaving Gallagher's band, Martin and drummer Rod de'Ath formed Ramrod, after which Martin played with Downliners Sect and Screaming Lord Sutch, and also toured with Chuck Berry and Albert Collins.

Martin played in the Nickey Barclay band in London in the 1980s, alongside Barclay (ex-Fanny) on keyboards, with John Conroy (ex-Sam Mitchell Band) and Dave Ball on lead guitar (ex-Procol Harum). The band played across London on the blues rock circuit during the 1980s at venues such as The White Lion, Putney; The Star and Garter on Lower Richmond Road; The Golden Lion, Fulham and the Cartoon, Croydon.

Killing Floor released an album in 2004 named Zero Tolerance, on which Martin participated.

Death
After a period of illness including cancer and a number of strokes, Martin died peacefully in a hospital in Bournemouth, Dorset on 17 August 2012, aged 63.

References

1949 births
2012 deaths
Musicians from Belfast
Keyboardists from Northern Ireland
British blues pianists
Blues musicians from Northern Ireland
20th-century pianists